The 1921 college football season had no clear-cut champion, with the Official NCAA Division I Football Records Book listing California Golden Bears, Cornell Big Red, Iowa Hawkeyes, Lafayette Leopards, Washington & Jefferson Presidents, and Vanderbilt Commodores as champions. Only California, Cornell, Iowa, and Lafayette claim national championships for the 1921 season.

Andy Smith's Pacific Coast Conference champion "Wonder Team" at California continued on its streak since 1920. Eastern power Cornell was coached by Gil Dobie and led by one of the sport's great backfields with George Pfann, Eddie Kaw, Floyd Ramsey, and Charles E. Cassidy. Jock Sutherland's Lafayette Maroons were led on the line by Frank Schwab.

Big Ten champion Iowa upset Notre Dame 10–7.  Grantland Rice noted that the 1921 Notre Dame team "was the first team we know of to build its attack around a forward passing game, rather than use a forward passing game as a mere aid to the running game."

1921 was the last season for the old Southern Intercollegiate Athletic Association. Vanderbilt tied co-champion Georgia on an onside kick. On October 6, Centre upset Harvard 6–0 in what is widely considered one of the greatest upsets in college football history. Overjoyed students painted the "impossible formula" C6H0 (Centre 6, Harvard 0) on everything in sight. Georgia Tech also claimed a conference title.

The 1922 Rose Bowl was fought to a scoreless tie, between California and Washington & Jefferson, in the last Rose Bowl to be played at Tournament Park. Washington & Jefferson is the smallest school to ever play in a Rose Bowl.

Conference and program changes

Conference establishments
Two conferences began play in 1921:
Midwest Collegiate Athletic Conference – an active NCAA Division III conference
Southwestern Athletic Conference – an active NCAA Division I FCS conference

Membership changes

First radio broadcast
A historical highlight of the regular season was the 1921 West Virginia vs. Pittsburgh football game, the first college football game to be broadcast live on radio.  Today, college football on radio is common for nearly every game in every division.

C6H0

On October 29, Centre College beat Harvard 6 to 0 in what is widely considered one of the greatest upsets in college football history. Overjoyed students painted the "impossible formula" C6H0 (Centre 6, Harvard 0) on everything in sight.

Bowl games

In the 1922 Rose Bowl, heavily favored California played Washington
 & Jefferson to a scoreless tie.  The game holds several distinctions including being the only scoreless contest and the first tie in a Rose Bowl. Charles Fremont West of Washington & Jefferson was the first African-American quarterback to play in the Rose Bowl, and Herb Kopf, also of Washington and Jefferson, was the first freshman to play in a Rose Bowl. The 1922 Rose Bowl was the last played at Tournament Park and featured the smallest school—Washington & Jefferson College had only 450 students at the time—to ever play in a Rose Bowl.

Other bowls
 Dixie Classic
 San Diego Christmas Classic

Conference standings

Major conference standings

Independents

Minor conferences

Minor conference standings

Awards and honors

All-Americans

The consensus All-America team included:

Statistical leaders
 Total offense leader: Aubrey Devine, Iowa, 2211
 Receptions leader: Eddie Anderson, Notre Dame, 26
 Receiving yards leader: Eddie Anderson, 394

References